Khartoum is the capital city of Sudan.  The term may also refer to:

 Khartoum (state), Sudan
 Khartoum North (al-Khartūm Bahrī), a city close to, but distinct from, Khartoum in central Sudan
 The Siege of Khartoum, a battle between Egyptian and Sudanese forces in 1885
 Khartoum (film), a 1966 film about this event starring Charlton Heston and Laurence Olivier
 Khartum, a ghost town along Highway 41 in Greater Madawaska, Ontario, Canada
 Khartoum Resolution of September 1, 1967, formed the basis of Arab policy toward Israel and in which the Arab states declared: "No peace with Israel, no recognition of Israel, no negotiations with Israel"
 Khartoum League, a historical football championship in Sudan
 Khartoum gerbil Dipodillus stigmonyx, a gerbil found mainly in Sudan
 Khartoum (album) and Khartoum Variations albums by Texan musician Jandek
The Aladdin character
 In the movie, The Godfather, Khartoum was a champion racehorse owned by movie producer Jack Woltz. His name might be based on the Sudanese capital city, Khartoum.